Shakhid Raduyevich Baysayev (1939–2000) was a Chechen civilian who was forcibly disappeared (and presumably summarily executed) after being detained by Russian special police forces on the outskirts of Grozny, Chechnya on 2 March 2000. His body was never found.

Biography
Shakhid Baysayev was born in 1939 in Podgornoye, a suburb of Grozny in the Chechen-Ingush Autonomous Soviet Socialist Republic. In 2000 he worked as an auto mechanic at a local company; he was married with five children.

Disappearance
On the morning of March 2, 2002, the Russian OMON paramilitary police forces, who had just suffered significant casualties from a notorious friendly fire incident in this neighbourhood of Grozny, conducted a search operation for suspected rebel fighters who were blamed for the incident. Baysayev was detained on his way to work; a witness described him as being in pain ,and his appearance suggested that he had been beaten. Russian troops filmed the detention themselves and later sold the videotape to his wife, Asmart Baysayeva, for $1,000; the video shows Baysayev lying on the ground and being kicked by a soldier before being taken away. She was also given a sketched map purportedly showing where her husband was buried; at the site, she found a fragment of cloth that looked like it came from his coat.

Investigation
After the detention of her husband, Baysayeva immediately complained to the authorities. Despite her continued efforts and the existence of the footage of the detention, however, the Russian authorities failed to carry out an effective investigation, prompting Baysayeva to turn to the European Court of Human Rights (ECHR). On April 5, 2007, in the ruling in the case Baysayeva v. Russia, the European Court ruled that Baysayev's detention was unlawful and that he must be presumed dead. The Court also found it "astonishing" that the servicemen depicted in the video, who were unmasked, have still not been identified by the official investigation.

See also 
 List of people who disappeared

References

External links
European rights court rules against Russia in case of missing Chechen, International Herald Tribune, April 5, 2007
Rights court blames Russia for Chechen's abduction, Reuters/AlertNet, April 5, 2007 
Wife Of Missing Chechen Wins Lawsuit Against Russia, Radio Free Europe/Radio Liberty, April 5, 2007

1939 births
2000 deaths
2000s missing person cases
Chechen murder victims
Chechen people
Chechen victims of human rights abuses
Missing people
Missing person cases in Russia
People declared dead in absentia
People of the Chechen wars
Russian people of Chechen descent